Kari Markus Granlund (born 16 April 1993) is a Finnish professional ice hockey forward, who is currently playing with HC Lugano of the National League (NL). After the 2022 Russian invasion of Ukraine, he elected to leave the KHL team Salavat Yulaev Ufa. He is a second-round selection of the Calgary Flames, taken 45th overall at the 2011 NHL Entry Draft. Granlund played two seasons in the SM-liiga for HIFK before moving to North America to join the Flames organization in 2013. His older brother Mikael plays in the NHL for the Pittsburgh Penguins.

Playing career
A native of Oulu, Finland, Granlund played minor hockey in his hometown before joining Helsinki-based club HIFK's junior teams in 2009. He made his SM-liiga debut in the 2010–11 season, appearing in two games with the senior squad, but spent the majority of the year with HIFK's junior team, where he recorded 20 goals and 52 points in 40 games. The National Hockey League (NHL)'s Calgary Flames selected him with their second round pick, 45th overall, at the 2011 NHL Entry Draft.  Granlund opted to remain in Finland for the 2011–12 season where he joined HIFK's senior team full-time and played on the same line as his brother, Mikael.  Markus finished the season with 34 points in 47 games, then recorded 30 points in 50 games for HIFK in 2012–13.

Granlund moved to North America following his second year in the SM-liiga as he signed a three-year contract with the Flames on 19 April 2013. He was assigned to Calgary's American Hockey League (AHL) affiliate, the Abbotsford Heat, to begin the 2013–14 season. He initially struggled to adapt to life in Canada, and while he had a clause in his contract that would allow him to return to Finland, Granlund opted to remain with the Flames organization. He earned a brief recall to Calgary in late December 2013 but did not appear in an NHL game. Granlund was the AHL's leading goal scorer among rookies with 23 at the time of his second recall in late February, and made his NHL debut on 27 February 2014, in a 2–0 loss to the Los Angeles Kings. He recorded his first NHL point in his third game, an assist on 3 March against his brother's Minnesota Wild. On the same day, the AHL named him that league's rookie of the month for February. He recorded 12 points in 10 games and was a +6 over that time. Granlund scored his first goal two nights later in a 4–1 win over the Ottawa Senators.

In the 2015–16 season, the last season of his entry-level deal, Granlund was reassigned to begin the year with new AHL affiliate, the Stockton Heat. The Flames recalled him after scoring a goal and assist in the Heat's inaugural game on 15 October 2015. After 31 games with the Flames, contributing with 7 points, Granlund was traded by Calgary to the Vancouver Canucks in exchange for Hunter Shinkaruk on 22 February 2016. On 22 June 2018, the Canucks re-signed Granlund to a one year, 1.475M contract.

During the 2019 offseason, the Canucks did not tender a qualifying offer to Granlund, releasing him as a free agent. On 1 July 2019, he agreed to a one-year, $1.3 million contract with his third Western Canadian club, the Edmonton Oilers. In the 2019–20 season, Granlund struggled to make an impression with the Oilers collecting just three goals and 4 points in 34 regular season games before he was waived and reassigned to AHL affiliate, the Bakersfield Condors. Granlund registered 15 points in 20 games with the Condors before the season was abruptly ended due to the COVID-19 pandemic. 

As an impending free agent and left off the Oilers' return-to-play roster, Granlund halted his NHL career by agreeing to a two-year contract with Russian club Salavat Yulaev Ufa of the KHL on 17 July 2020.

During the midst of his second season with Salavat, in March 2022, Granlund left Salavat Yulaev Ufa ahead of the playoffs due to the Russian invasion of Ukraine.

As a free agent, Granlund continued his European career by signing a two-year contract with Swiss National League club, HC Lugano, on 19 July 2022.

Career statistics

Regular season and playoffs

International

See also
List of family relations in the NHL

References

External links
 

1993 births
Living people
Abbotsford Heat players
Adirondack Flames players
Bakersfield Condors players
Calgary Flames draft picks
Calgary Flames players
Edmonton Oilers players
Finnish ice hockey centres
HIFK (ice hockey) players
HC Lugano players
Salavat Yulaev Ufa players
Sportspeople from Oulu
Stockton Heat players
Vancouver Canucks players
Ice hockey players at the 2022 Winter Olympics
Olympic ice hockey players of Finland
Medalists at the 2022 Winter Olympics
Olympic gold medalists for Finland
Olympic medalists in ice hockey